This is a list of Belgian television related events from 1986.

Events
2 March - Sandra Kim is selected to represent Belgium at the 1986 Eurovision Song Contest with her song "J'aime la vie". She is selected to be the thirty-first Belgian Eurovision entry during Eurosong held at the RTBF Studios in Brussels.
3 May - Belgium wins the 31st Eurovision Song Contest in Bergen, Norway. The winning song is "J'aime la vie", performed by 13-year-old Sandra Kim.

Debuts

Television shows

1980s
Tik Tak (1981-1991)

Ending this year

Births
24 May - Antony Arandia, actor
27 May - Timo Descamps, actor, voice actor, singer & TV host
13 October - Sam De Bruyn, TV & radio host

Deaths